The European Union (Accessions) Act 2006 (c 2) is an Act of the Parliament of the United Kingdom which ratified and legislated for the accession of Romania and Bulgaria to the European Union. It received Royal assent on 16 February 2006.

The Act is amended by articles 3, 4 and 6 of the Treaty of Lisbon (Changes in Terminology) Order 2011 (S.I. 2011/1043).

Section 1 - Accession treaty
Section 1(1) inserts section 1(2)(r) of the European Communities Act 1972.

Section 1(2) provides that the treaty concerning the accession of the Republic of Bulgaria and Romania to the European Union, signed at Luxembourg on 25 April 2005 is approved for purposes of section 12 of the European Parliamentary Elections Act 2002.

Section 2 - Freedom of movement for workers
Section 2(1) provides:

"Secretary of State"
This means one of Her Majesty's Principal Secretaries of State.

Order made under this section
The Accession (Immigration and Worker Authorisation) Regulations 2006 (S.I. 2006/3317)

See also
Treaty of Accession 2005
European Union (Accessions) Act 2003
List of Acts of the Parliament of the United Kingdom relating to the European Communities / European Union

References
Halsbury's Statutes,

External links
The European Union (Accessions) Act 2006, as amended from the National Archives.
The European Union (Accessions) Act 2006, as originally enacted from the National Archives.
Explanatory notes to the European Union (Accessions) Act 2006.

United Kingdom Acts of Parliament 2006
Acts of the Parliament of the United Kingdom relating to the European Union
2006 in the European Union